Guugu Yalandji (Kuku-Yalanji) is an Australian Aboriginal language of Queensland.  It is the traditional language of the Kuku Yalanji people.  Despite conflicts between the Kuku Yalanji people and British settlers in Queensland, the Kuku Yalanji language has a healthy number of speakers, and that number is increasing.  Though the language is threatened, the language use is vigorous and children are learning it in schools.  All generations of speakers have positive language attitudes. The Kuku Yalanji still practice their traditional religion, and they have rich oral traditions.  Many people in the Kuku Yalanji community also use English.  100 Kuku Yalanji speakers can both read and write in Kuku Yalanji.

Phonology

Vowels 
Kuku-Yalanji uses the typical three-vowel system, /a, u, i/, used in other Aboriginal Australian languages.

Consonants 
This table uses the standard orthography used by both linguists and the speech community. Stop sounds can range between voiced and voiceless releases. Where the orthography differs from the IPA representation, the orthography is in brackets.

References

External links 
 Bibliography of Gugu Yalandji people and language resources, at the Australian Institute of Aboriginal and Torres Strait Islander Studies
 Bibliography of Gugu Djangun people and language resources, at the Australian Institute of Aboriginal and Torres Strait Islander Studies
 Bibliography of Gugu Gulunggur people and language resources, at the Australian Institute of Aboriginal and Torres Strait Islander Studies
 Bibliography of Gugu Muluriji people and language resources, at the Australian Institute of Aboriginal and Torres Strait Islander Studies
 Bibliography of Gugu Wakura people and language resources, at the Australian Institute of Aboriginal and Torres Strait Islander Studies

Yalanjic languages